Eupithecia tenuisquama is a moth in the family Geometridae. It is a widespread species, ranging from the Himalaya to Japan.

References

Moths described in 1896
tenuisquama
Moths of Asia